General Low may refer to:

Alexander Low (British Army officer) (1817–1904), British Army general
John Low (East India Company officer) (1788–1880), British Indian Army general
Robert Low (Indian Army officer) (1838–1911), British Indian Army general

See also
Hudson Lowe (1769–1844), British Army major general
William Lowe (British Army officer) (1861–1944), British Army major general
Sigismund von Löw (1757−1846), British Hanoverian general